Jordan Leavitt (born June 2, 1995) is an American mixed martial artist who competes in the Lightweight division of the Ultimate Fighting Championship.

Background
Leavitt’s MMA journey began in high school as part of the wrestling team. Initially quitting during his first year, he stumbled across The Ultimate Fighter on TV and immediately fell in love with the sport, re-joining the wrestling team and competing for the next three years.

As of August 2018, Leavitt majors in political science at the University of Nevada, Las Vegas, and has dreams of law school and a career in family law. He postponed these dreams in favor of his fighting career, but with hopes to pursue law school once again after that.

Mixed martial arts career

Early career
Making his MMA debut at Gladiator Challenge Fight Club, Leavitt would win his first bout after submitting Tony Martinez via Peruvian Necktie in the second round. Leavitt would go on to defeat Lucas Neufeld at Tuff N’ Nuff Fight Night via unanimous decision, Roy Ostrander  at Final Fighting Championship 36 via arm-triangle choke, John Walker via heel hook in round one at Gladiator Challenge Holiday Beatings, and finally Isaiah William via unanimous decision at BCM Promotions Fight Night 8 to pick up his second decision win as a professional.

In his debut promotional appearance with Legacy Fighting Alliance at LFA 85, he submitted Levion Lewis via anaconda choke in the second round.

Leavitt was invited to Dana White's Contender Series 27 on August 4, 2020. He won the fight via arm-triangle choke in the first round and was subsequently awarded a UFC contract.

Ultimate Fighting Championship
Leavitt made his UFC debut against Matt Wiman on December 5, 2020 at UFC on ESPN: Hermansson vs. Vettori. He won the bout via slam knockout in round one. This fight earned him the Performance of the Night award.

Leavitt faced Claudio Puelles in his sophomore performance on June 5, 2021 at UFC Fight Night: Rozenstruik vs. Sakai. He lost the bout via unanimous decision.

Leavitt faced Matt Sayles on December 18, 2021 at UFC Fight Night: Lewis vs. Daukaus. He won the bout via submission due to an inverted triangle choke in the second round, being only the third fighter in UFC history to do so.

Leavitt was scheduled to face Victor Martinez on April 16, 2022 at UFC on ESPN 34. However, Martinez withdrew from the event for unknown reasons and was replaced by promotional newcomer Trey Ogden. Leavitt won the bout via split decision.

Leavitt next faced Paddy Pimblett on July 23, 2022 at UFC Fight Night 208. Leavitt lost the bout via rear-naked choke in the second round.

Leavitt faced Victor Martinez on February 25, 2023 at UFC Fight Night 220. He won the fight via technical knockout in round one. This win earned him the Performance of the Night bonus.

Championships and accomplishments
 Ultimate Fighting Championship
 Performance of the Night (Two times)

Mixed martial arts record

|-
| Win
|style="text-align:center"|11–2
|Victor Martinez
|TKO (elbows and knees)
|UFC Fight Night: Muniz vs. Allen
|
|style="text-align:center"|1
|style="text-align:center"|2:27
|Las Vegas, Nevada, United States
|
|-
|Loss
|style="text-align:center"|10–2
|Paddy Pimblett
|Submission (rear-naked choke)
|UFC Fight Night: Blaydes vs. Aspinall 
|
|style="text-align:center"|2
|style="text-align:center"|2:46
|London, England
|
|-
| Win
|style="text-align:center"|10–1
|Trey Ogden
|Decision (split)
|UFC on ESPN: Luque vs. Muhammad 2 
|
|style="text-align:center"|3
|style="text-align:center"|5:00
|Las Vegas, Nevada, United States
|
|-
| Win
| style="text-align:center"|9–1
| Matt Sayles
|Submission (inverted triangle choke)
|UFC Fight Night: Lewis vs. Daukaus
|
| style="text-align:center"|2
| style="text-align:center"|2:05
|Las Vegas, Nevada, United States
|
|-
| Loss
| style="text-align:center"|8–1
| Claudio Puelles
|Decision (unanimous)
|UFC Fight Night: Rozenstruik vs. Sakai
|
|style="text-align:center"|3
|style="text-align:center"|5:00
|Las Vegas, Nevada, United States
| 
|-
| Win
| style="text-align:center"| 8–0
| Matt Wiman
|KO (slam)
|UFC on ESPN: Hermansson vs. Vettori
|
|style="text-align:center"|1
|style="text-align:center"|0:22
|Las Vegas, Nevada, United States
| 
|-
| Win
| style="text-align:center"| 7–0
| Jose Flores
|Submission (arm-triangle choke)
|Dana White's Contender Series 27
|
|style="text-align:center"|1
|style="text-align:center"|4:15
|Las Vegas, Nevada, United States
|
|-
| Win
|style="text-align:center"| 6–0
|Leivon Lewis
|Submission (anaconda choke)
|LFA 85
|
|style="text-align:center"|2
|style="text-align:center"|2:01
|Sioux Falls, South Dakota, United States
|
|-
| Win
| style="text-align:center"|5–0
|Izzy William
|Decision (unanimous)
|BCM Promotions Fight Night 8
|
|style="text-align:center"|3
|style="text-align:center"|5:00
|Mansfield, Ohio, United States
|
|-
| Win
| style="text-align:center"| 4–0
| Johnny Walker
|Submission (heel hook)
|Gladiator Challenge: Holiday Beatings
|
|style="text-align:center"|1
|style="text-align:center"|0:17
|Hemet, California, United States
|
|-
| Win
| style="text-align:center"|3–0
| Ray Ostrander
| Submission (arm-triangle choke)
| Final Fight Championship 36
| 
| style="text-align:center"| 1
| style="text-align:center"| 1:30
|Las Vegas, Nevada, United States
|
|-
| Win
| style="text-align:center"|2–0
| Lucas Neufeld
| Decision (unanimous)
|Tuff-N-Uff Fight Night
|
| style="text-align:center"|3
| style="text-align:center"|5:00
|Las Vegas, Nevada, United States
|
|-
| Win
| style="text-align:center"|1–0
| Tony Martinez
| Submission (Peruvian Necktie)
|Gladiator Challenge: Fight Club
|
|style="text-align:center"|2
|style="text-align:center"|2:43
|El Cajon, California, United States
|

See also 
 List of current UFC fighters
 List of male mixed martial artists

References

External links 
  
 

1995 births
Living people
American male mixed martial artists
Lightweight mixed martial artists
Mixed martial artists utilizing wrestling
Mixed martial artists utilizing Brazilian jiu-jitsu
Ultimate Fighting Championship male fighters
American male sport wrestlers
Amateur wrestlers
American practitioners of Brazilian jiu-jitsu